Lymantria mathura, the rosy gypsy moth, is a species of moth of the family Erebidae found in the Russian Far East, Nepal, Japan (Hokkaido, Honshu, Kyushu), the Korean Peninsula, northern India and China (at least Hebei, Heilongjiang, Jilin also in the west). The species was first described by Frederic Moore in 1866.

The wingspan is 40–50 mm for males and 70–90 mm for females. Larvae have been recorded feeding on Terminalia, Shorea, Quercus, Mangifera, Eugenia and Mitragyna. It is considered a pest, since it is a major defoliator of deciduous trees.

Subspecies
Lymantria mathura mathura
Lymantria mathura aurora Butler, 1877 (Japan, Korea, Amur, China, Taiwan)
Lymantria mathura subpallida Okano, 1959 (Taiwan)

Gallery

See also
Gypsy moth

References

External links
Biology and behavior of Lymantria mathura Moore (Lepidoptera: Lymantriidae)
Data sheets on quarantine pests - Lymantria mathura

Lymantria
Moths of Asia
Moths described in 1866
Moths of Japan